Lee Man Football Club is a Hong Kong professional football club based in Tseung Kwan O, which currently competes in the Hong Kong Premier League. The club is owned by Lee & Man Chemical.

History 
Lee & Man Paper were the main sponsors and operators of Rangers during the 2016–17 season. The club played that season using the team name Lee Man Rangers.

The following season, Lee & Man decided to invest their money in building their own football club. They paid a HK$1 million entrance fee to the Hong Kong Football Association for the right to enter a club directly into the Hong Kong Premier League. The club hired former Hong Kong international Fung Ka Ki as their first manager on 3 July 2017. Fung would only last one season as manager as the club finished a disappointing 8th place.

On 21 May 2018, Lee Man hired former Hong Kong and Macau manager Chan Hiu Ming as its head coach. Under Chan, the club won its first trophy, capturing the 2018–19 Hong Kong Sapling Cup on 27 April 2019 in a 3–2 victory over Yuen Long.

Team staff
{|class="wikitable"
|-
!Position
!Staff
|-
|Head coach|| Tsang Chiu Tat
|-
|Assistant coach|| Jordi Tarrés
|-
|Goalkeeping coach|| Cheng Ho Man
|-
|Fitness coach|| Lee Kin Wai
|-
|Analytical coach|| Kwok Chun Lam
|-

Current squad

First team 

 FP

 FP
 FP
 FP

 FP

 FP

 

 FP

 FP

Out on loan

Remarks:
LP These players are considered as local players in Hong Kong domestic football competitions.
FP These players are registered as foreign players.

Season-to-season record

Note:

Continental record

Honours

Cup competitions
Hong Kong Sapling Cup
Champions (1): 2018–19
Hong Kong Senior Shield
Runners-up (1): 2019–20

Head coaches
 Fung Ka Ki (2017–2018)
 Lam Hing Lun (2018)
 Fung Hoi Man (2018)
 Chan Hiu Ming (2018–2023)
 Tsang Chiu Tat (2023–present)

References

External links 
 Official Site

 
2017 establishments in Hong Kong
Football clubs in Hong Kong
Association football clubs established in 2017
Hong Kong Premier League clubs